Scott & Bailey is a British television programme detailing the personal and professional lives of Detectives Janet Scott (Lesley Sharp) and Rachel Bailey (Suranne Jones), both of whom work for the Syndicate 9 Major Incident Team of the fictional Manchester Metropolitan Police, a murder investigation squad headed by successive senior investigators DCI Gill Murray (Amelia Bullmore) and DSI Julie Dodson (Pippa Haywood). The series debuted on 29 May 2011 and concluded on 27 April 2016.

Series overview

Episodes

Series 1 (2011)

Series 2 (2012)

Series 3 (2013)

Series 4 (2014)

Series 5 (2016)

Home video releases

Notes

References

External links
 
 

Lists of British crime television series episodes
Lists of British drama television series episodes